The 1909 South Kilkenny by-election was held on 10 August 1909.  The by-election was held due to the incumbent Irish Parliamentary MP, Nicholas Joseph Murphy, being declared bankrupt.  It was won by the Irish Parliamentary candidate Matthew Keating, being elected unopposed.

References

1909 elections in Ireland
By-elections to the Parliament of the United Kingdom in County Kilkenny constituencies
1909 elections in the United Kingdom
Unopposed by-elections to the Parliament of the United Kingdom (need citation)